Zoran Krušvar is a Croatian psychologist and science fiction and fantasy writer, born on April 9, 1977, in Rijeka.  He won 4 SFERA awards, in 2002 (for Igra), in  2003 (for Brodovi u tami), in 2007 (for Izvršitelji nauma Gospodnjeg) and in 2008 (for Tako biti mora) from the Zagreb-based science fiction society SFera.

Krušvar's first novel, Izvršitelji nauma Gospodnjeg, was a multimedia project, first of such kind in Croatia. DVD distributed with the book contains music video soundtrack to the novel, and the trailer for the book was released on YouTube a month before its publishing.  At the presentation of the novel on April 22, 2007, a group of young people acted out a ritual sacrifice of a young maiden in order to propitiate God, so the novel would sell better.

Bibliography
 Najbolji na svijetu (2004, Mentor; 2006, Biblioteka SFera)
 Izvršitelji nauma Gospodnjeg (2007, Mentor)
 Zvijeri plišane (2008, Knjiga u centru)
 Kamov se vraća kući. (2010, Mentor)

References
 https://web.archive.org/web/20040630041309/http://www.sfera.hr/zbirke/krusvar.php

External links
 Izvršitelji nauma Gospodnjeg - official website
 Interview, October 2009

1977 births
Living people
Croatian science fiction writers
Croatian fantasy writers
Writers from Rijeka